Tom's Restaurant is a family owned diner, currently in its third generation, with locations in Prospect Heights, Brooklyn and Coney Island opened in 1936. 

In 2022, Eaters named Tom's one of the "16 NYC Brunch Spots Worth Planning the Weekend Around."

History
Tom's opened in 1936 as an ice cream parlor called Lewnes Ice Cream. In 2015, the block they were on was co-named Gus Vlahavas Place, after the second generation owner who had recently passed away.

Popular culture
Jeffrey Eugenides wrote Middlesex with Tom's as his inspiration.

References

Diners in New York (state)
Restaurants in Brooklyn
Prospect Heights, Brooklyn
Coney Island